The women's 4 × 400 metres relay at the 2007 Pan American Games was held on July 28.

Results

References
Official results

Relay
2007
2007 in women's athletics